Andwell Brewing Company was started by Adam Komrower in 2008, and was based at Lodge Farm behind Newlyns farmshop in North Warnborough, Hampshire, England. The brewery's beer is supplied to pubs within a 30-mile radius of the brewery, and to farmshops, off-licences and beer festivals.

The brewery brewed its first beer, Resolute Bitter, on 10 October 2008. The 10BBL brewhouse plant was previously used at Copper Dragon Brewery.

In 2011 the brewery relocated to the hamlet of Andwell from where the brewery takes its name.  The brewery now has a shop, and offers tours.

Beers
Andwell's produce four permanent beers.  They have a brewery shop and run brewery tours.

Resolute Bitter
 3.8% abv (also available in bottles at 4.1% abv)

Andwell's description: “Light amber best bitter with balanced aromas  bitterness”. The brewery's literature says that this bitter is named after a town in the Arctic.  Adam Komrower, the brewery's founder visited 'Resolute' in 2007 from where he set out on the 2007 Polar Challenge to reach the 1996 Magnetic North Pole.  The bitter has a malty and hoppy flavour with a light amber colour and has the lowest alcohol content of Andwell's beers.

Gold Muddler
(Blonde Ale) 3.9% abv (also available in bottles at 4.2% abv). Andwell's description: "Light ale with fresh taste and citrus aroma".

The brewery's literature says this beer is named after a fishing fly used for luring trout.  Gold Muddler is a blonde ale that uses pale ale malt. Gold Muddler has a citrus aroma with a balanced bitterness.

King John
4.2% abv (also available in bottles at 4.6% abv). Andwell's description: "Rich amber beer with a fruity hoppyness"

The brewery's literature says this pale ale takes its name from the castle built by King John in 1207 less than one mile from the brewery, from where King John rode out to Runnymede to sign the Magna Carta. The beer is deep amber in colour with a blend of pale ale and crystal malt, the bitterness and fruity aroma are developed from a combination of hops.

Ruddy Darter
4.6% abv (also available in bottles at 4.9% abv)

Andwell's description: "rich ruby ale with a fruity aroma"

The brewery's literature says this beer is named after a deep red dragon fly found in rivers and wetlands local to the brewery.  The beer is the newest to the Andwell's range and was launched to celebrate Andwell's first birthday in October 2009.

Andwell's supplied the first Hampshire Oktoberfest, run by CAMRA in October 2009.

References

External links
 Company website

Buildings and structures in Hampshire
Food and drink companies established in 2008
Breweries in England
British companies established in 2008
2008 establishments in England
Companies based in Hampshire
Odiham